Modo (stylized as MODO, and originally modo) is a polygon and subdivision surface modeling, sculpting, 3D painting, animation and rendering package developed by Luxology, LLC, which is now merged with and known as Foundry. The program incorporates features such as n-gons and edge weighting, and runs on Microsoft Windows, Linux and macOS platforms.

History
Modo was created by the same core group of software engineers that previously created the pioneering 3D application LightWave 3D, originally developed on the Amiga platform and bundled with the Amiga-based Video Toaster workstations that were popular in television studios in the late 1980s and early 1990s. They are based in Mountain View, California.

In 2001, senior management at NewTek (makers of LightWave) and their key LightWave engineers disagreed regarding the notion for a complete rewrite of LightWave's work-flow and technology. NewTek's Vice President of 3D Development, Brad Peebler, eventually left Newtek to form Luxology, and was joined by Allen Hastings and Stuart Ferguson (the lead developers of Lightwave), along with some of the LightWave programming team members (Arnie Cachelin, Matt Craig, Greg Duquesne, Yoshiaki Tazaki).

After more than three years of development work, Modo was demonstrated at SIGGRAPH 2004 and released in September of the same year. In April 2005, the high-end visual effects studio Digital Domain integrated Modo into their production pipeline. Other studios to adopt Modo include Pixar, Industrial Light & Magic, Zoic Studios, id Software, Eden FX, Studio ArtFX, The Embassy Visual Effects, Naked Sky Entertainment and Spinoff Studios.

Modo 201 was the winner of the Apple Design Awards for Best Use of Mac OS X Graphics for 2006. In October 2006, Modo also won "Best 3D/Animation Software" from MacUser magazine. In January 2007, Modo won the Game Developer Frontline Award for "Best Art Tool".

Modo was used in the production of feature films such as Stealth, Ant Bully, Iron Man, and Wall-E.

Workflow
Modo's workflow differs substantially from many other mainstream 3D applications. While Maya and 3ds Max stress using the right tool for the job, Modo artists typically use a much smaller number of basic tools and combine them to create new tools using the Tool Pipe and customizable action centers and falloffs.

Action centers
Modo allows an artist to choose the "pivot point" of a tool or action in realtime simply by clicking somewhere. Thus, Modo avoids making the artist invoke a separate "adjust pivot point" mode. In addition, the artist can tell Modo to derive a tool's axis orientation from the selected or clicked on element, bypassing the needs for a separate "adjust tool axis" mode.

Falloffs
Any tool can be modified with customizable falloff, which modifies its influence and strength according to geometric shapes. Radial falloff will make the current tool affect elements in the center of a resizable sphere most strongly, while elements at the edges will be barely affected at all. Linear falloff will make the tool affect elements based on a gradient that lies along a user-chosen line, etc.

3D painting
Modo allows an artist to paint directly onto 3D models and even paint instances of existing meshes onto the surface of an object. The paint system allows users to use a combination of tools, brushes and inks to achieve many different paint effects and styles. Examples of the paint tools in Modo are airbrush, clone, smudge, and blur. These tools are paired with your choice of "brush" (such as soft or hard edge, procedural). Lastly, you add an ink, an example of which is image ink, where you paint an existing image onto a 3D model. Pressure-sensitive tablets are supported. The results of painting are stored in a bitmap and that map can be driving anything in Modo's Shader Tree. Thus you can paint into a map that is acting as a bump map and see the bumps in real-time in the viewport.

Renderer
Modo's renderer is multi-threaded and scales nearly linearly with the addition of processors or processor cores. That is, an 8-core machine will render a given image approximately eight times as fast as a single-core machine with the same per-core speed. Modo runs on up to 32 cores and offers the option of network rendering.

In addition to the standard renderer, which can take a long time to run with a complex scene on even a fast machine, Modo has a progressive preview renderer which renders to final quality if left alone. Modo's user interface allows you to configure a work space that includes a preview render panel, which renders continuously in the background, restarting the render every time you change the model. This gives a more accurate preview of your work in progress as compared to the typical hardware shading options. In practice, this means you can do fewer full test renders along the way toward completion of a project. The preview renderer in Modo 401 offers progressive rendering, meaning the image resolves to near final image quality if you let it keep running.

Modo material assignment is done via a shader tree that is layer-based rather than node-based. As of version 801, node-based shading is a part of the work flow as well.

Modo's renderer is a physically based ray-tracer. It includes features like caustics, dispersion, stereoscopic rendering, fresnel effects, subsurface scattering, blurry refractions (e.g. frosted glass), volumetric lighting (smokey bar effect), and Pixar-patented Deep Shadows.

Select features

 Tool Pipe for creating customized tools
 Scripting (Perl, Python, Lua)
 Customizable User Interface
 Extensive file input and output

Key modeling features

 N-gon modeling (subdivided polygons with >4 points) and
 Mesh Instancing
 Retopology Tools
 A powerful sculpting toolset
 Procedural modeling with "Mesh Operators"
 MeshFusion (Non destructive subD boolean operations)

Key animation features

 Animate virtually any item's properties (geometry, camera, lights)
 Layerable deformers
 Morph target animation
 Rigging with full-body Inverse kinematics
 Dynamic parenting

Key rendering features

 Global Illumination
 Physical Sun and Sky
 Displacement Rendering
 Interactive Render Preview
 IEEE Floating Point Accuracy
 Subsurface scattering
 Instance Rendering
 Physically Based Shading Model
 Motion Blur
 Volumetric rendering
 Depth of Field
 Network Rendering 
 3d paint toolset

Modo once included imageSynth, a Plug-in for creating seamless textures in Adobe Photoshop CS1 or later. This bundle ended with the release of Modo 301. Luxology has announced that the imageSynth plugin for Photoshop has been retired.

References

Further reading

External links
 
 Luxology's Modo 501 at GDC 2011from Intel.com

3D graphics software
Global illumination software
3D animation software
3D computer graphics software for Linux
Proprietary commercial software for Linux